Kim Chang-hwan (born 24 September 1916) is a South Korean fencer. He competed in the team foil and épée events at the 1964 Summer Olympics.

References

External links
 

1916 births
Possibly living people
Olympic fencers of South Korea
Fencers at the 1964 Summer Olympics
South Korean male foil fencers
South Korean male épée fencers